Zuke may refer to:

Zucchini, a summer squash often nicknamed "zuke"
Mike Zuke (born 1954), retired professional ice hockey centreman
Bill Supplee (1903–1966), American educator and college athlete (nicknamed "Zuke")
Fukujinzuke, Japanese pickled condiments

See also
 Zucchini (disambiguation)
 Cuke (disambiguation)